Bobby Setzer (born June 16, 1976) is a former American football defensive end. He played for the San Francisco 49ers in 2001 and for the Chicago Bears in 2002.

References

1976 births
Living people
American football defensive ends
Boise State Broncos football players
San Francisco 49ers players
Chicago Bears players
Frankfurt Galaxy players